The Mary Ellis grave is a grave located behind an AMC Theatre on U.S. Route 1 in New Brunswick, Middlesex County, New Jersey, United States. Seven relatives are also buried and marked on the grave itself. 

Mary Ellis, a native of South Carolina, was a property owner and fierce feminist in New Brunswick, noted to even vote in city elections before the right for women to vote was passed. Living on Livingston Avenue, Ellis maintained a garden on her property until a local politician, James Schureman, took the land to build a street on it. In response, she posted a sign on the new Schureman Street calling it "Oppression Street".  Historians believed that around 1813, Ellis moved from downtown New Brunswick to a secluded area known as Mount Hemlock, which overlooked the Raritan River. She lived there until her death in 1828. A niece of Ellis' respected her request to be buried on the land of which she lived overlooking the Raritan River. 

The choice of Mount Hemlock for Ellis' residence and later burial site is part of local legend. Mary Ellis is believed to have met a sailor who she fell in love with, some day wanting to marry him. Once the sailor departed, she would return to the Raritan River on a knoll for a long time to keep a look out for his return, which would never occur. She continued to stand watch. However, historians have doubted the truth to this story noting her past as a person who would not waste that kind of time. The band Looking Glass, created of students at Rutgers University, wrote their 1972 song "Brandy (You're a Fine Girl)" with a story similar to Ellis' in terms of a bartender who finds someone she loves but the sailor preferring the sea as his true love. However, the members of the band denied there was any connection between the Ellis story and the song's lyrics.   

By June 1956, the gravestone had been knocked over into the grounds below, and remained in that location for several years. John E. Burke, who had purchased the property in 1943 and then ran the Raritan Playland Amusement Park on the site, wanted to relocate the graves and gravestone, but declined once he learned that he would be required to contact and obtain written permission from all the families of those buried there before such a move would be permitted.

In 1965, with the construction of the Great Eastern Department Store on the site of her former residence, the company constructed a protective wall along the burial site and the toppled gravestone. This new construction created a  pit in the parking lot, which soon attracted debris and littering. However, by 1980, Ray Travis and the son of Burke, operating the site as the Route 1 Flea Market since 1975, felt it was time to replace the concrete pit with dirt and move the granite gravestone to ground level. Several local historians were upset by the decision to do this as they were unaware that the move was meant to help preserve, not destroy, the graves. Travis spent more than $1,000 (1980 USD) for eleven truckloads of dirt in order to fill in the fenced grave pit and that he had also planned to landscape the area. 

On August 16, 1980, a float was run during the Raritan River Festival, commemorating the impact of Mary Ellis in New Brunswick history. Once the Route 1 Flea Market was razed and replaced with a Loews Theatre, the parking lot was re-graded, resulting in the gravestone towering over the parking lot.

Mary Ellis
Mary Ellis (1750–1828) was a spinster in New Brunswick, New Jersey. According to oral tradition, she was seduced by a sea captain who vowed to return to marry her. He never returned and she would come to the spot where her grave now stands, each day, to look for his ship in the Raritan River in New Brunswick.

Additional deceased
 Mildred Moody (1746–1816) who married Thomas M. Evans
 Thomas M. Evans (1790–1820)
 Mary Ellis (1750–1828)
 Margaret Ellis (1767–1850) who married Anthony Walton White (1750–1803), General of the United States Army
 Eliza Mary White (1792–1861) who married Thomas M. Evans
 Elizabeth Margaret Evans (1813–1898)
 Isabelle Johanna Evans (1815–1901)

References

External links
 

Cemeteries in Middlesex County, New Jersey
Loew's Theatres buildings and structures
Buildings and structures in New Brunswick, New Jersey
1828 establishments in New Jersey